The Finnish Handball Association (SKPL) is the administrative and controlling body for handball and beach handball in Republic of Finland. Founded in May 1941, SKPL is a founder member of both the European Handball Federation (EHF) and the International Handball Federation (IHF).

National teams
 Finland men's national handball team
 Finland men's national junior handball team
 Finland women's national handball team

Competitions
 Finnish Handball League

References

External links
 Official website  
 Finland at the IHF website.
 Finland at the EHF website.

Sports organizations established in 1941
1941 establishments in Finland
Handball governing bodies
Handball in Finland
Sports governing bodies in Finland
European Handball Federation
National members of the International Handball Federation